Spirou et l'aventure, written and drawn by Jijé, is the first published album containing Spirou et Fantasio adventures. The 6 featured stories were produced during and after World War II, and serialised in the Franco-Belgian comics magazine  (Spirou magazine) during this unusual period. They were assembled and published as a hardcover album in 1948 and feature the first appearances of Fantasio.

Story
Contains the stories:
 Le meeting aérien (1943)
 Autour du monde avec le pilote rouge (1944)
 Le voyage dans le temps (1944–45)
 L'enlèvement de Spip (1945)
 La jeep de Fantasio (1945–46)
 Fantasio et le Fantôme (1946)

Background
These stories are considered Jijé's 4th-9th Spirou stories, independent of the work when he functioned as a collaborator on the earliest work by Rob-Vel.

This collection is not regarded among the regular series as it had limited publication, and some of the original plates are thought to be lost.

Two of the stories, La jeep de Fantasio and Fantasio et le Fantôme were later published in the "hors-séries" albums, HS2 Radar le robot and HS4 Fantasio et le fantôme et 4 autres aventures.

Footnotes

Sources

 Joseph Gilain (Jijé) publications in Spirou BDoubliées 
 Les Mémoires de Spirou, Thierry Martens, Jean-Paul Tibéri, Dupuis, 1989. p. 160

References

External links
 Spirou official site album index 

Spirou et Fantasio albums
1948 books
1948 comics debuts
Works originally published in Spirou (magazine)
Literature first published in serial form